The Oath of Allegiance (Judicial or Official Oath) is a promise to be loyal to the British monarch, and his or her heirs and successors, sworn by certain public servants in the United Kingdom, and also by newly naturalised subjects in citizenship ceremonies. The current standard wording of the oath of allegiance is set out in the Promissory Oaths Act 1868.

Variants of the basic oath of allegiance are also incorporated into a number of other oaths taken by certain individuals.

Text
The current standard oath of allegiance is set out from the Promissory Oaths Act 1868 in the following form:

Under the Oaths Act 1888 (51 & 52 Vict. c.46), consolidated and repealed by the Oaths Act 1978, those who choose to may make a solemn affirmation instead of swearing an oath.

Oaths of office, of allegiance, and judicial oath
The Victorian promissory oaths of allegiances, are set out in the Promissory Oaths Act 1868 in the following form:

The original oath of allegiance as set out in the 1868 Oaths Act:

The original oath of office as set out in the 1868 Oaths Act:

The original judicial oath as set out in the 1868 Oaths Act:

Oaths to heirs and successors
In general, this oath is sworn to the Crown, monarch, sovereign, or regent, as represented by the incumbent king or queen, currently Charles III. This oath also specifies that this same oath to the king, is equally sworn to his "heirs and successors", in the plural, rather than a single heir and successor. This indicates that any oath given to the king is equally given to William, Prince of Wales, Prince George, and all of his heirs and successors to the British throne, in the event that any one of them should accede to the throne. Thus, the pledge of loyalty to the Crown made in the oath does not end at the death of the current monarch.

This oath to the king, his heirs and successors is now administered in citizen ceremonies to immigrants becoming naturalized British subjects.

Members of the judiciary (justices of the peace, district judges, circuit judges etc.) swear their allegiance to the king, and to his heirs and successors; police officers in England and Wales pledge their allegiance to the king, but not his heirs and successors. Members of the Northern Ireland Assembly and the Police Service of Northern Ireland (PSNI) do not swear an oath of allegiance. The PSNI in 2001 replaced the Royal Ulster Constabulary, whose members pledged their allegiance to the King, but not his heirs and successors. The Scottish police have never pledged allegiance. Members of the Privy Council only swear allegiance to the "King's majesty", not to the king's heirs and successors.

History

Origins
The oath of allegiance was performed to King Edgar and was possibly instituted by King Arthur  By the common law, the oath is due of everyone 12 years of age or older.

The oath was certainly in use as of the date of King John's Magna Carta, signed on 15 June 1215.

Once the terms had been finalised on 19 June, the rebels again swore allegiance to King John. The later Bill of Rights (1689) included the Oath of Allegiance to the Crown, which was required by Magna Carta to be taken by all crown servants and members of the judiciary.

Over the following centuries this evolved into three separate oaths: of supremacy (repudiation of the spiritual or ecclesiastical authority of any foreign prince, person or prelate), allegiance (declaration of fidelity to the Sovereign), and in 1702, abjuration (repudiation of the right and title of descendants of James II to the throne). Oaths of allegiance were exacted from the Lords by Henry IV and Henry VI in 1455 and 1459, and an oath of supremacy was introduced under Henry VIII in 1534. Elizabeth I introduced an Act of Supremacy in 1563 requiring an oath to be taken by all future members of the House of Commons. A new oath of allegiance appeared under James I (prompted by the "Gunpowder Plot") under the Popish Recusants Act 1605 and the Oath of Allegiance Act 1609. This oath required recognition of James I as lawful King and renunciation of the Pope. The 1609 Act required Commons MPs to take the oath of allegiance and of supremacy, but this was not a "parliamentary" oath, as it was not taken in Parliament, and there were no consequences if not sworn.

17th and 18th centuries

After the Restoration, oaths of supremacy and allegiance were imposed upon all MPs and peers in Parliament. In 1689, in an Act passed by William III and Mary II, old oaths of supremacy and allegiance were replaced with shorter ones, almost to its modern form.

The exiled King James II died in 1701, and King Louis XIV of France and the adherents of the Stuart claim proclaimed James's son rightful king. The Act of Settlement 1701 was quickly passed to address the new situation. It extended substantially the old oaths, and added an oath of abjuration of the Pretender's title. This oath pledged support for the Hanoverian succession and for the exclusion of the Stuarts.

19th century
The 1858 act 21 & 22 Vict. c.48 prescribed a single form of the oath in place of the former three. This single form retained a declaration of allegiance and a promise to defend the Hanoverian succession. A declaration relating to the supremacy of the sovereign was also included and the oath continued to be made ’on the true faith of a Christian’ However, both of these latter elements disappeared from the revised version of the single oath that was subsequently prescribed in the Parliamentary Oaths Act 1866, which repealed much of the earlier pieces of legislation insofar as they related to oaths taken by Members of Parliament.

Finally, in the Promissory Oaths Act 1868 a further curtailment to the oath was made, thereby establishing the form of the oath still used today. The direct religious content has disappeared along with the declarations relating to the supremacy of the sovereign. In its current form, the oath conforms fairly closely to the medieval (feudal) oath of allegiance.

20th century
After the general right to affirm was guaranteed in 1888, the Oaths Act 1909 introduced a change to the ordinary method of taking oaths, which provided for oaths to be sworn on the Bible: in case of a Christian, on the New Testament, and in the case of a Jew on the Old Testament. This Act also established the usual form of taking the oath, with the phrase "I swear by Almighty God that …". Section 1 of the Oaths Act 1888 (on the right to affirm) was replaced in the Administration of Justice Act 1977.

The Oaths Act 1961 extended the 1888 Act, but did not apply to parliamentary oaths. All of the provisions in the Oaths Acts of 1838, 1888, 1909, 1961 and 1977 were repealed and consolidated in the Oaths Act 1978, although the form of wording of the oath set out in the 1868 Act was preserved. The 1978 Oaths Act contains provisions relating to the manner of administering the oath, the option of swearing with uplifted hand, the validity of oaths, the making of solemn affirmations and the form of affirmation. The current Oath of Allegiance or Official Oath is set out in the Promissory Oaths Act 1868.

Historical oaths

To James I

To Charles I

To George IV

Office-holders
The Oath of Allegiance or Official Oath is made by each of the following office-holders as soon as may be after their acceptance of office:

First Lord of the Treasury (currently held ex officio by the Prime Minister)
Second Lord of the Treasury (currently held ex officio by the Chancellor of the Exchequer)
Lord Chancellor
Lord President of the Council
Lord Privy Seal
Secretaries of State
President of the Board of Trade
Lord Steward
Lord Chamberlain
Earl Marshal
Master of the Horse
Chancellor of the Duchy of Lancaster
Paymaster General
Keeper of the Great Seal of Scotland (since 1999 held ex officio by the First Minister of Scotland)
Keeper of the Privy Seal of Scotland
Lord Clerk Register
Advocate General for Scotland
Lord Justice Clerk
First Minister of Wales (since the Government of Wales Act 2006 came into force in May 2007)

The Oath in England is tendered by the Clerk of the Privy Council, and taken in the presence of Her Majesty in Council, or otherwise as His Majesty shall direct, and in Scotland is tendered by the Lord President of the Court of Session at a sitting of the court.

Privy counsellor oath

On appointment a new privy counsellor takes the oath of allegiance, or affirms loyalty:

Parliamentarians
Under the Parliamentary Oaths Act 1866, members of both Houses of Parliament are required to take an Oath of Allegiance upon taking their seat in Parliament, after a general election, or by-election, and after the death of the monarch. Until the oath or affirmation is taken, an MP may not receive a salary, take their seat, speak in debates or vote. The wording of the oath comes from the Promissory Oaths Act 1868:

Members who object to swearing the oath are permitted to make a solemn affirmation under the terms of the Oaths Act 1978:

The oath or affirmation must be taken in English although the Speaker has allowed Members to recite Welsh, Scottish Gaelic, Irish, Scots, Ulster Scots or Cornish forms in addition, and texts of the oath and affirmation in Braille are available for use by Members of both Houses with impaired sight. While the oath is taken, the new member holds a copy of a sacred text. While there is no set list of sacred texts for use, this is normally a copy of the New Testament or Bible for Christians, or, for Jews, the Tanakh. Muslims or Sikhs have been sworn in the usual manner except with the Qur'an (in an envelope, to avoid it being touched by one not of the faith) and Guru Granth Sahib respectively. Mohammad Sarwar, a Muslim, took the oath in this way in May 1997. Religious restrictions in the oath effectively barred individuals of certain faiths (e.g., Roman Catholics, Jews and Quakers) from entering Parliament for many years.  The restrictions were lifted by the Oaths Act 1888 after the six-year effort (1880–1886) of the noted atheist Charles Bradlaugh to claim his seat.

A new Parliament and the Demise of the Crown
After a general election, the new Parliament is opened by the Royal Commission in the House of Lords, in the presence of Members of both Houses, after which the House of Commons meets to elect a Speaker and the Lords commences oath taking.

Following the Demise of the Crown (the death or abdication of the current monarch), all Members of Parliament and members of the House of Lords have the opportunity to take an oath of allegiance to the new Sovereign at the first meeting of Parliament under a new monarch. The House votes an Address to the Crown in response to the official notification of the previous monarch's demise, expressing condolences upon the death of the previous monarch and pledging loyalty to his or her successor.

After the death of Elizabeth II, members of both houses of parliament met the following day to pay tribute. Senior members of parliament took the oath to King Charles III on Saturday 10 September. Other members of parliament were offered the opportunity to take the oath to the new sovereign but it was confirmed that this was not a formal requirement.

Order of seniority
At the start of a new Parliament, after the Commons Speaker has taken the oath, MPs come forward one by one to swear or affirm at the despatch-box, in order of seniority.
 Father of the House (longest continuous serving member).
 Cabinet ministers.
 Shadow cabinet ministers.
 Privy counsellors.
 Other ministers.
 Other members by seniority.
If two or more MPs enter the house at the same election their seniority is determined by the date and/or time they took the oath.

Taking the oath in the House of Commons
The Principal Clerk of the Table Office at the despatch box offers a choice of affirmation or oath cards to read. The MP takes the oath or affirms, then moves along the Table to the Clerk Assistant and signs the Test Roll, a parchment book headed by the oath and affirmation which is kept by the Clerk of the House of Commons.

State Opening
After the initial swearing in process, most MPs and Members of the Lords are able to sit and vote in each House. Any remaining MPs or Members of the Lords can take the oath at later sittings. When the majority of MPs and Members of the Lords have been sworn in, both Houses of Parliament are ready to hear the King's Speech at the State Opening starting the business of the session.

By-elections and MPs
MPs who have been elected at a by-election are accompanied from the bar of the House by two sponsors. The new Member will have collected a certificate relating to his or her election from the Public Bill Office to hand to the Clerk of the House before taking the oath or making the affirmation.

Scottish Parliament
Section 84 of the Scotland Act 1998 requires Members of the Scottish Parliament to take the Oath of Allegiance at a meeting of the Parliament. Members of the Scottish Government and junior Scottish Ministers are additionally required to take the Official Oath.

Senedd Cymru - Welsh Parliament
Section 23 of the Government of Wales Act 2006 requires members of the Senedd to take the oath of allegiance. A Welsh form of the Oath is prescribed by the National Assembly for Wales (Oath of Allegiance in Welsh) Order 1999:

Wording in other languages 

The Welsh wording is:

The corresponding affirmation is:

The Scottish Gaelic wording is:

The Cornish wording is:

Refusing to take the oath
Those elected to the House of Commons, to the Scottish Parliament, or to the Senedd who refuse to take the oath or affirmation are barred from participating in any proceedings, and from receiving their salaries. Members of the House of Commons could also be fined £500, and have their seat declared vacant "as if [they] were dead", if they attempt to do so. Under the Parliamentary Oaths Act 1866, any peer voting, or sitting in the House of Lords without having taken the oath, is subject, for every such offence, to a penalty of £500. Members of the Scottish Parliament must take the oath within two months of being elected, failing which they cease to be members and their seat is vacated.

On 1 April 1998, the House of Lords Information Office published a list of 260 peers who had not made the oath of allegiance as members of that House and were therefore not allowed to sit, speak or vote in the Lords. These were listed as 35 Conservatives; 4 Labour; 2 Liberal Democrats; 46 crossbenchers; and 173 of undeclared political alliances. By rank, these were listed as 3 Royal Dukes (the Duke of Edinburgh, the Prince of Wales and the Duke of York); 12 other Dukes; 16 Marquesses; 48 Earls; 32 Viscounts; 3 Countesses; and 152 baron(esse)s. Following the later reform of the House of Lords, these are no longer listed as members of the House of Lords.

Northern Ireland Assembly
Although an oath of allegiance is required of members of the Scottish Parliament and the Senedd, there is no requirement for members of the Northern Ireland Assembly to take an oath of allegiance, or any other oath, nor is there any form of voluntary oath prescribed for those who may wish to swear one. However, members are required to sign the Assembly's roll of membership, designate their identity as "Nationalist", "Unionist" or "Other", and take a Pledge of Office. Ministers can be removed from office if the responsibilities of the pledge are not met. Members pledge:

Judges and magistrates (England and Wales)
Judges and magistrates on being sworn in, are required by various statutes to take two oaths: the oath of allegiance and the judicial oath, (collectively; the judicial oath). Judges of Hindu, Jewish, Muslim and Sikh religions can omit the words "I swear by Almighty God" and replace it with an acceptable alternative.

Judges' first Oath of Allegiance:

Judges' second Judicial Oath:

Magistrates' first Oath of Allegiance:

On 1 November 2010, in an official ceremony at Swansea's magistrates’ court in Wales, ten trainee magistrates were the first magistrates in the United Kingdom to swear their oath of allegiance to the Queen "and her heirs".

Magistrates' second Judicial Oath:

Judicial oaths are enshrined in a number of statutes:

 The Lord Chief Justice, Master of the Rolls, President of the Queen's Bench Division, President of the Family Division and the Chancellor of the High Court - s.10 Supreme Court Act 1981
 Puisne Judges of the High Court - s.10(4) Supreme Court Act 1981
 Circuit Judges and Recorders - s.22 Courts Act 1971
 Recorder of London - Promissory Oaths Act 1868 Schedule Pt II
 District Judges - s.76(1)(a) of the Courts and Legal Services Act 1990
 Justices of the Peace - Promissory Oaths Act 1868 Schedule Pt II

Notaries public (England & Wales) 
A notary public seeking admission to the roll in England and Wales must swear the Oath of Allegiance and the Oath of Office, which is prescribed by s. 7 Public Notaries Act 1843.

Police officers
England and Wales:

Scotland:

Police in Scotland do not swear an oath of allegiance. Prior to the 1 April 2013 the following declaration was made:

The Police and Fire Reform (Scotland) Act 2012 replaced the previous declaration with the following:

Northern Ireland:

Northern Ireland police do not swear an oath to the monarch.

Until September 2001:

From November 2001:

Clergy
Any person being ordained as a priest or deacon of the Church of England, or taking up any "perpetual curacy, lectureship, or preachership", is required by the Clerical Subscription Act 1865 to take an Oath of Allegiance and Supremacy. This is now, by the Promissory Oaths Act 1868, the same as the usual Oath of Allegiance. Canon C13 now requires the oath of allegiance to be made by anyone appointed archbishop or bishop, priest or deacon, or to be licensed or admitted to any office in the Church of England.

Armed forces
All persons enlisting or commissioning in the British Armed Forces, except Royal Navy Officers, are required to attest to the following oath or equivalent affirmation, with the date of attestation treated as the commencement of service even if not reporting for training 'til a later date:

Until recently no oath of allegiance was sworn by members of the Royal Navy, which is not maintained under an Act of Parliament but by the royal prerogative. This is still the case for officers as, by nature of the Navy's authority deriving from the Crown and not Parliament, the loyalty of naval officers to the Sovereign is taken for granted.

Citizenship ceremonies

The Oath of Allegiance, with the addition of the words "on becoming a British citizen" (or other type of British national, as appropriate), is also used at citizenship ceremonies, where persons being registered or naturalised in the United Kingdom are required to swear or affirm their allegiance to the King, his heirs and successors, and additionally make a pledge to follow the laws of the country and uphold its democratic values. The applicants are then presented with their certificate of citizenship.

Citizenship Oath of Allegiance:

Citizenship Pledge

Scouts and Girl Guides

The principle of swearing an oath, or form of promise, is well exemplified in the constitution of the World Organization of the Scout Movement (WOSM), Article II, paragraph 2: "Adherence to a promise and law," the principles of Duty to God, Duty to others and Duty to self. The Scout Promise; On my honour I promise that I will do my best—To do my duty to God and the King (or to God and my Country) …… This is in line with the majority of international Scout oaths to "God and my Country." In order to accommodate many different religions within Scouting, "God" may refer to a higher power, and is not specifically restricted to the God of the monotheistic religions. WOSM explains "Duty to God" as "Adherence to spiritual principles, loyalty to the religion that expresses them, and acceptance of the duties resulting therefrom." Wording variations are allowed in order to accommodate different religious obligations and national allegiances.

UK Scout Association. (Age 10+ and adults)

 
Scout Promise in Welsh (Addewid y Sgowtiaid)

(UK SA) Beaver Scouts (Age 6 to 8)

(UK SA) Cub Scouts (Age 8 to 10)

Girlguiding UK

Baden-Powell Scouts' Association (Age 11+)

(BPSA) Beaver Scouts (5 to 8 years)

(BPSA) Wolf Cubs (8 to 11 years)

Opposition to the oath

Proposed amendments to oath

There have been several private members' bills in recent years concerning the parliamentary oath. None have been successful. The following have occurred since the passing of the Oaths Act 1978:

Democratic Oaths Bill 1987-88137 (Tony Benn) 
21 July 1988 Presentation and first reading

Parliamentary Declaration Bill 1997-98138 (Tony Benn)
13 January 1998 Presentation and First Reading

Parliamentary Oaths (Amendment) proposed Bill 1997-98139 (Kevin McNamara)
29 July 1998 Motion for leave to introduce a Bill. Negatived on division (137 to 151)

Parliamentary Oath (Amendment) proposed bill 1999-2000140 (Kevin McNamara)
14 November 2000 Motion for leave to introduce a Bill. Negatived on Division (129 to 148)

A Motion to introduce a bill entitled "Treason Felony, Act of Settlement and Parliamentary Oath Bill" was moved by Kevin McNamara on 19 December 2001. It did not progress further than its first reading.

Republican parliamentarians

Republicans have expressed opposition to a compulsory oath made to an unelected monarch.

 Tony Benn in 1992 stated, when he took the oath, "As a dedicated republican, I solemnly swear ...".  After the 1997 election, "As a committed republican, under protest, I take the oath required of me by law, under the Parliamentary Oaths Act of 1866, to allow me to represent my constituency ..." Later, he stated, "When one looks at the oaths of a Privy Counsellor, a Member of Parliament and the Sovereign at the coronation, they throw an interesting light on the obligations by which we are bound. The reality is that nobody takes an oath to uphold democracy in Britain. The Queen takes an oath to govern the country and uphold the rights of the bishops. We take an oath to the Queen. Nobody in the House takes an oath to uphold democracy in Britain." Tony Benn's Commonwealth of Britain Bill proposed that MPs and other officials swear oaths to a Constitution rather than the Crown.
 Kevin McNamara stated: "The era in which it was thought to be appropriate for legislators to set a political or religious test for those deemed acceptable to enter the parliamentary club has long since passed. ... The only test for inclusion and membership of this House should be the will of the electorate, freely expressed."
 Dennis Skinner stated, "I solemnly swear that I will bear true and faithful allegiance to the Queen when she pays her income tax". He is also alleged to have added "and all who sail in her" to the oath, implying he was referring to the HMS Queen Elizabeth rather than the monarch herself.
 Tony Banks was seen with his fingers crossed when he took the oath in 1997.
 Richard Burgon in 2015 prefaced his oath by expressing his support for constitutional change for an elected head of state: "As someone that believes that the head of state should be elected I make this oath in order to serve my constituents".
 Colum Eastwood of the Irish nationalist Social Democratic and Labour Party stated in 2019, "Under protest and in order to represent my constituency, I do solemnly (...). My true allegiance is to the people of Derry and the people of Ireland."
 Also in 2019, SNP member Steven Bonnar visibly crossed his fingers during the affirmation. He also added to the official text "I take this oath to ensure that I can represent the people of Coatbridge, Chryston and Bellshill in Scotland". Some other SNP members also added similar statements to the oath's wording.

Parliamentary
According to "The Parliamentary Oath" even if the entire country were to vote in a general election for a party whose manifesto pledge was to remove the monarchy, it would be impossible by reason of the present oath, and current acts of parliament, for such elected MPs to take their seats in the House of Commons, or be raised to the House of Lords, without taking this Oath of Allegiance to the ruling monarch, and to his heirs, and successors. However, there would be nothing to prevent a Parliamentary majority debating a republic or from seeking to renegotiate the constitutional settlement since freedom of speech is guaranteed by article 9 of the Bill of Rights 1689.

The requirement to take the oath/affirmation is also enshrined in the Code of Conduct for MPs. Should an MP take part in parliamentary proceedings, without having sworn the oath, or affirmation, the penalty is £500 for every offence, together with vacation of his or her seat. Before 1997, MPs who did not take the oath, whilst unable to receive their salary, were entitled to the other facilities of the House. After the 1997 general election, the Speaker, Betty Boothroyd, made a new ruling on entitlement to salary, allowances and services as they relate to Members who have not taken the oath. This removed the right of any such MPs to the services of the House. Following the 2001 general election, and the election of four Sinn Féin members, the following Speaker, Michael Martin, re-iterated his predecessor's comments.

An Early Day Motion to change the Oath of Allegiance was brought before the House of Commons by 22 Members of Parliament, on 12 June 2008. Early Day Motion (#1780) read as follows:

Scottish Parliament
Alex Salmond of the Scottish National Party, as the first party leader to be sworn into the Scottish Parliament in 2011, before raising his right hand to swear allegiance to the Queen, the SNP leader said: "The Scottish National Party's primary loyalty is to the people of Scotland, in line with the Scottish constitutional tradition of the sovereignty of the people."
The Scottish Socialist Party, who advocate the abolition of the monarchy have made a number of protests during their Oaths of Allegiance in the Scottish Parliament. Their former leader Tommy Sheridan swore an oath of allegiance to the Queen with a clenched fist in 1999, Rosie Kane held her own protest during the oath ceremony, during which she swore allegiance with the words "My oath is to the people" written on her raised hand, Colin Fox sang Robert Burns' "A Man's A Man for A' That" at his protest, before being moved to the end of the queue by presiding officer Sir David Steel.

Pressure groups
Campaign group Republic also challenges the oath of allegiance. Represented by human rights lawyer Louise Christian, their campaign is seeking to change the law so MPs et al, can swear allegiance to the country and people, rather than the monarchy: "It is vital we challenge offensive and discriminatory oaths of allegiance - if our elected MPs ignore our calls we’ll take this issue to court."

Sinn Féin
The Irish republican party Sinn Féin follows a policy of abstaining from the House of Commons; this is because its members refuse to recognise the legitimacy of the British Parliament, as a body that legislates for Northern Ireland. The party also rejects the sovereignty of the British Crown in Northern Ireland, and as a result, even if its members wished to take up their seats, they would likely refuse to take the oath, and thereby would forfeit their seats and become liable to a fine of £500, recoverable by action in the High Court of Justice. As absentees, Sinn Féin MPs are denied their salaries, worth around £1.5 million over the five years to 2009, but may claim staff costs and additional accommodation allowances.

It is unknown whether Sinn Féin MPs would reconsider their policy of abstentionism if the oath were abolished, or if a new oath or pledge were adopted without any mention of the monarch or the Crown. From 1922 a similar situation pertained with respect to the Irish Free State Oireachtas (parliament), which Sinn Féin boycotted because it did not recognise the state. Fianna Fáil split from Sinn Féin in 1926 by proposing to enter the Oireachtas if it could do so without taking the Oireachtas oath of allegiance to George V. Although the oath was abolished in 1933, Sinn Féin continued to boycott each Oireachtas until 1986.

In 1999 the Sinn Féin member of parliament Martin McGuinness challenged the legitimacy of the Oath of Allegiance required of British MPs by taking the matter to the European Court of Human Rights. The application was deemed inadmissible on the basis that the requirement of an oath to the reigning monarch was "reasonably viewed as an affirmation of loyalty to the constitutional principles which support... the workings of representative democracy in the respondent State".

See also
Irish Civil War
Oath of allegiance (worldwide concept)

References

External links
 Hansard: Tony Benn on oaths and constitutional matters

Government of the United Kingdom
United Kingdom
British monarchy
British nationality law